The Thunder Lake II Site, also designated 20ST109, is an archaeological site located near Thunder Lake in Schoolcraft County, Michigan. The site dates from the Woodland period. It was listed on the National Register of Historic Places in 2014.

References

Geography of Schoolcraft County, Michigan
Archaeological sites on the National Register of Historic Places in Michigan
National Register of Historic Places in Schoolcraft County, Michigan